Yohanny Valera (August 29, 1976 in Santo Domingo, Dominican Republic) is a former Major League Baseball catcher who played for the Montreal Expos in the  season. He played in seven career games, with no hits in 10 at-bats, with one walk.

Career
He was signed by the New York Mets as an amateur free agent in 1993 and also played in the Montreal Expos, Tampa Bay Devil Rays, and Detroit Tigers organizations before leaving organized baseball after the 2003 season. Valera also played in for the Aces, a traveling team in the Northeast League, in 2004. He spent a season with the Worcester Tornadoes of the Can-Am League and won the league championship in 2005, then spent a year with Italy's Bbc Grosseto. He returned to the US in 2007 playing for Worcester, then the Sussex Skyhawks in 2008, and one final professional season with Worcester in 2009.

External links
, or Retrosheet

1976 births
Living people
Capital City Bombers players
Dominican Republic expatriate baseball players in Canada
Dominican Republic expatriate baseball players in the United States
Erie SeaWolves players
Grosseto Baseball Club players
Harrisburg Senators players
Kingsport Mets players

Leones del Escogido players
Major League Baseball catchers
Major League Baseball players from the Dominican Republic
Montreal Expos players
Norfolk Tides players
Northeast League Aces players
Orlando Rays players
People from Santo Domingo
St. Lucie Mets players
Sussex Skyhawks players
Toledo Mud Hens players
Worcester Tornadoes players
Dominican Republic expatriate baseball players in Italy